Nowe Chrapowo  (formerly ) is a village in the administrative district of Gmina Bielice, within Pyrzyce County, West Pomeranian Voivodeship, in north-western Poland.

For the history of the region, see History of Pomerania.

Notable residents
 Richard Voß (1851-1918), dramatist and novelist

References

Nowe Chrapowo